The Last Live Video is a live DVD/VHS released by X Japan on March 29, 2002. It contains the band's last concert performance, before their reunion in 2007, recorded at the Tokyo Dome on December 31, 1997. The Last Live was also released on a three CD set of the same name.

Track listing
Disc one
 "Amethyst (S.E.)""
 "Rusty Nail"
 "Week End"
 "Scars"
 "Dahlia"
 "Drum Break"
 "Drain"
 "Piano Solo"
 "Crucify My Love"
 "Longing ~Togireta Melody~"
 "Kurenai"
 "Orgasm"

Disc two
 "Drum Solo"
 "Forever Love"
 "Prologue (~World Anthem) (S.E.)"
 "X"
 "Endless Rain"

X Japan video albums
X Japan live albums
2002 video albums
Live video albums
2002 live albums
Albums recorded at the Tokyo Dome